Boo language may refer to:
Boo (programming language)
Boo dialect, of the Teke-Ebo language
Boko language (Benin), also called Boo language
Bomu language, also called Boo, or Western Bobo Wule language
Bozo language, ISO 639 code boo, spoken in Mali

See also
 Boo (disambiguation)